Julio J. Pereyra Mele (3 January 1963 – 18 November 2016) was an Uruguayan former basketball player who competed in the 1984 Summer Olympics.

References

External links

1963 births
2016 deaths
Uruguayan men's basketball players
Olympic basketball players of Uruguay
Basketball players at the 1984 Summer Olympics
Place of birth missing
Place of death missing